Tulasnella is a genus of effused (patch-forming) fungi in the order Cantharellales. Basidiocarps (fruit bodies), when visible, are typically smooth, ceraceous (waxy) to subgelatinous, frequently lilaceous to violet-grey, and formed on the underside of fallen branches and logs. They are microscopically distinct in having basidia with grossly swollen sterigmata (or epibasidia) on which basidiospores are formed. One atypical species, Tulasnella aurantiaca, produces orange to red, gelatinous, pustular anamorphs on wood. Some species form facultative mycorrhizas with orchids and liverworts. Around 80 species of Tulasnella are known worldwide.

Taxonomy

History
Tulasnella was originally circumscribed by German mycologist Joseph Schröter in 1888, partly based on an earlier illustration by Charles Tulasne, after whom the new genus was named. Schröter believed the unusual basidia sufficiently distinct to warrant the creation of a new genus which he considered intermediate between Sebacina (then used for most effused "heterobasidiomycetes" with septate basidia) and Thelephora (then used for many effused "holobasidiomycetes" with conventional non-septate basidia). The genus was subsequently placed among the "heterobasidiomycetes" by most authors.

Between 1909 and 1928, French mycologists Hubert Bourdot and Amédée Galzin described more than a dozen new species of Tulasnella from collections made in France. In the USA, American mycologist D.P Rogers published a review of the Tulasnellaceae in 1933 in which he extended the definition of Gloeotulasnella, originally established to accommodate cystidiate species, to include "all mucous forms", though Gloeotulasnella was subsequently considered synonymous with Tulasnella by most authors. Later, in Australia, Jack Warcup and P.H.B. Talbot described several new Tulasnella species isolated from orchid mycorrhizas. In 1987 American mycologist Royall T. Moore proposed the new genus Epulorhiza for anamorphic (hyphal) states of Tulasnella previously referred to the form genus Rhizoctonia. In the UK in the 1990s, Peter Roberts described additional new species of Tulasnella and monographed the genus in a series of papers with a worldwide key to species.

Current status

Molecular research, based on cladistic analysis of DNA sequences, has confirmed Tulasnella as a distinct genus, but has placed it within the Cantharellales rather than in its own order the Tulasnellales.

Following changes to the International Code of Nomenclature for algae, fungi, and plants, the practice of giving different names to teleomorph and anamorph forms of the same fungus has been discontinued, meaning that Epulorhiza has become a synonym of the earlier name Tulasnella. As a result, existing anamorphic species have been transferred to Tulasnella and new anamorphic species have been described in this genus.

Molecular research has also shown that the anamorphic, pustular, wood-inhabiting genus Hormomyces is a synonym of Tulasnella, not Tremella as previously thought.

An updated morphological key to species was published in 2016.

Association with orchids

In 1899 French botanist Noël Bernard discovered that orchid seeds require a fungal associate to germinate and most if not all orchids maintain this mycorrhizal association with fungi throughout their lifecycle. In the 1960s, cultures derived from orchid mycorrhizas that were induced to form teleomorphs (fruit bodies) showed that Tulasnella species (together with Rhizoctonia species) were frequent associates of terrestrial orchids in Australia. Direct DNA sequencing of orchid mycorrhizas has confirmed this association on a global scale, for both terrestrial and epiphytic orchids. Most recently described anamorphic Tulasnella species have been isolated from orchid mycorrhizas, but many more await formal description.

Association with liverworts

Molecular research has shown that thalloid liverworts in the family Aneuraceae associate frequently and perhaps exclusively with species of Tulasnella, ether in a mycorrhizal or parasitic relationship.

Species

Species currently accepted by Species Fungorum

Tulasnella aggregata 
Tulasnella albertensis 
Tulasnella albida 
Tulasnella allantospora 
Tulasnella amonilioides 
Tulasnella anaticula 
Tulasnella andina 
Tulasnella anguifera 
Tulasnella asymmetrica 
Tulasnella aurantiaca 
Tulasnella australiensis 
Tulasnella balearica 
Tulasnella bifrons 
Tulasnella bourdotii 
Tulasnella brinkmannii 
Tulasnella bucina 
Tulasnella calendulina 
Tulasnella calospora 
Tulasnella concentrica 
Tulasnella conidiata 
Tulasnella convivalis 
Tulasnella cruciata 
Tulasnella cumulopuntioides 
Tulasnella curvispora 
Tulasnella cystidiophora 
Tulasnella danica 
Tulasnella deliquescens 
Tulasnella dendritica 
Tulasnella densa 
Tulasnella dissitispora 
Tulasnella echinospora 
Tulasnella eichleriana 
Tulasnella ellipsoidea 
Tulasnella epiphytica 
Tulasnella eremophila 
Tulasnella falcifera 
Tulasnella fuscoviolacea 
Tulasnella griseorubella 
Tulasnella guttulata 
Tulasnella helicospora 
Tulasnella hyalina 
Tulasnella inclusa 
Tulasnella inquilinia 
Tulasnella interrogans 
Tulasnella irregularis 
Tulasnella kiataensis 
Tulasnella kirschneri 
Tulasnella kongoensis 
Tulasnella korungensis 
Tulasnella lilacina 
Tulasnella multinucleata 
Tulasnella nerrigaensis 
Tulasnella occidentalis 
Tulasnella pacifica 
Tulasnella pallida 
Tulasnella pallidocremea 
Tulasnella papillata 
Tulasnella permacra 
Tulasnella phuhinrongklaensis 
Tulasnella pinicola 
Tulasnella prima 
Tulasnella pruinosa 
Tulasnella punctata 
Tulasnella quasiflorens 
Tulasnella robusta 
Tulasnella rogersii 
Tulasnella rosea 
Tulasnella saveloides 
Tulasnella secunda 
Tulasnella sphaerospora 
Tulasnella sphagneti 
Tulasnella subasymmetrica 
Tulasnella subglobospora 
Tulasnella thelephorea 
Tulasnella tomaculum 
Tulasnella traumatica 
Tulasnella valentini 
Tulasnella vernicosa 
Tulasnella tubericola 
Tulasnella violea 
Tulasnella warcupii 
Tulasnella zooctonia

Species currently regarded as synonyms by Species Fungorum

 T. albolilacea  = Tulasnella pallida
 T. anceps  = Rhizoctonia anceps, Ceratobasidiaceae
 T. araneosa  = Tulasnella pruinosa
 T. caroliniana  = Tulasnella allantospora
 T. cinchonae  - Rhizoctonia species, Ceratobasidiaceae
 T. cremea  = Tulasnella thelephorea
 T. eichleriana var. lilaceocinerea  = Tulasnella eichleriana
 T. grisea  = Rhizoctonia solani, Ceratobasidiaceae
 T. incarnata sensu auct. = Tulasnella violea 
 T. inclusa sensu auct. = Tulasnella thelephorea
 T. intrusa  = Tulasnella albida
 T. lactea  = Tulasnella eichleriana
 T. lividogrisea  = Auriculariales species
 T. metallica  = Scotomyces subviolaceus, Ceratobasidiaceae
 T. microspora  = Tulasnella eichleriana
 T. obscura  = Tulasnella eichleriana
 T. rosella  = Tulasnella deliquescens
 T. rubropallens  = Tulasnella allantospora
 T. sordida  = Tulasnella pinicola
 T. tremelloides  = Tulasnella pinicola
 T. violacea sensu auct. = Tulasnella pallida
 T. vitrea  = Basidiodendron species, Auriculariales

References

External links

Cantharellales
Agaricomycetes genera
Taxa named by Joseph Schröter
Taxa described in 1888